A solar observatory is an observatory that specializes in monitoring the Sun. As such, they usually have one or more solar telescopes.

The Einstein Tower  was a solar observatory in the Albert Einstein Science Park in Potsdam, Germany.

Solar observatories study phenomena associated with the Sun. The Sun, being the closest star to earth, allows a unique chance to study stellar physics with high-resolution. It was, until the 1990s, the only star whose surface had been resolved. General topics that interest a solar astronomer are its 11-year periodicity (i.e., the Solar Cycle), sunspots, magnetic field activity (see solar dynamo), solar flares, coronal mass ejections, differential rotation, and plasma physics.

Some examples
 Huairou Solar Observing Station
 Solar observatories in space
 National Solar Observatory

See also
 Coronagraph
 Heliometer
 Helioscope
 List of solar telescopes
 Spectroheliograph
 Spectrohelioscope
 Solar astronomy
 Solar tower (astronomy)
 Map of solar groundbased observatories and neutron monitors

References

External links
 

 
Astronomical observatories